Eupheme may refer to:

 Eupheme (deity), the ancient Greek female spirit of words of good omen
 Eupheme (moon), a moon of Jupiter
 Epimelitta eupheme, a species of beetle in the family Cerambycidae
 Mitsubishi Eupheme EV, a 2019–present Chinese subcompact electric SUV
 Mitsubishi Eupheme PHEV, a 2018–present Chinese compact plug-in hybrid SUV